Albaloo polo is an Iranian main dish of rice and sour cherries usually served with chicken, koobideh, or other types of kebab as well as some form of stews (khoresht). In Persian, albaloo is morello cherry; polo is pilaf, a style of cooked rice.

The herbs and spices used in this variation of polo vary, but typically include advieh, and saffron.

See also
 Culture of Iran
 Iranian cuisine
 Khoresht
 List of rice dishes
 Polow (pilaf, polo)

Rice dishes
Iranian cuisine
Persian words and phrases